Fudge 44 is a 2005 film from Irish director Graham Jones. It is a mockumentary about six puppets in an insolvent Tokyo children's puppet theatre who locals believe came to life and robbed a nearby bank to avoid being put out of business.

The Irish premiere took place on June 24, 2006 at the 7th International Darklight Festival, the Canadian premiere at RHIFF in Toronto on June 20 where it won an experimental award and the World Premiere at The Delray Beach Film Festival in Florida on March 10. The film was also winner of the 2007 Most Original Film Award at The Backseat Film Festival in Philadelphia and nominated for a 2006 Irish Digital Media Award.

References

External links

Graham Jones Official Website

2006 films
2005 drama films
2005 films
Irish drama films
2006 drama films